Chrysopsyche is a genus of moths in the family Lasiocampidae. The genus was erected by Arthur Gardiner Butler in 1880.

Species
Some species of this genus are:
Chrysopsyche albicilia Bethune-Baker, 1911
Chrysopsyche antennifera Strand, 1912
Chrysopsyche bivittata Aurivillius, 1927
Chrysopsyche imparilis Aurivillius, 1905 
Chrysopsyche jefferyi Tams, 1926
Chrysopsyche lamani Aurivillius, 1906
Chrysopsyche lutulenta Tams, 1923
Chrysopsyche mirifica (Butler, 1878)
Chrysopsyche pauliani Viette, 1962
Chrysopsyche pyriplecta Tams, 1930
Chrysopsyche pyrodes Tams, 1931
Chrysopsyche viridescens (Holland, 1893)
Chrysopsyche wilsoni Tams, 1928
Chrysopsyche yaundae Bethune-Baker, 1927

References

Lasiocampidae